Racket Boys is a 2021 South Korean television drama. The series, directed by Cho Young-kwang and written by Jung Bo-hun, stars Kim Sang-kyung, Oh Na-ra, Tang Jun-sang, Son Sang-yeon, Choi Hyun-wook, Kim Kang-hoon, Lee Jae-in, and Lee Ji-won. The series follows the growth of sixteen-year-old boys and girls and the challenges faced by badminton club at their school. It was premiered on SBS TV on May 31, 2021 and aired every Monday and Tuesday at 22:00 (KST). The series is available worldwide on Netflix for streaming.

Synopsis
A city kid is brought to the countryside by his father's new coaching gig: reviving a ragtag middle school badminton team on the brink of extinction. A story of a boys' badminton team at a middle school in Haenam as they grow, both as people and as players.

Yoon Hyun Jong was once a very good badminton player, but now he struggles to make ends meet for his family. Therefore, he jumps at a chance to coach a middle school team, only to find a team on the verge of disbandment with only three players: Bang Yoon Dam, Na Woo Chan, and Lee Yong Tae. The three boys struggle along, improving as Yoon Hae Kang, Yoon Hyun Jong's son, joins the team along with Jung In Sol. Now having enough players to enter competitions, they try to soar to new heights.

Meanwhile, Ra Young Ja, former top badminton player and Yoon Hyun Jong's wife, is the coach of the girls’ badminton team at a girl's middle school in Haenam. On her team are Han Se Yoon, the #1 ranked junior female player in Korea and Lee Han Sol, Se Yoon's best friend, allowing them to be one of the best teams among their peers.

Cast

Main
 Kim Sang-kyung as Yoon Hyeon-jong: A badminton coach and father of Hae-kang who moves to the countryside to earn more money
 Oh Na-ra as Ra Yeong-ja: A living legend in the badminton world and junior high school coach, also called as "Ranos" for her go-by-the-book attitude, mother of Yoon Hae-kang and Yoon Hae-in
 Tang Jun-sang as Yoon Hae-kang: An ex badminton prodigy and baseball enthusiast, who starts playing badminton again after moving to the countryside
 Son Sang-yeon as Bang Yoon-dam: The captain of the badminton club and ace player. He wants to have 100,000 followers on instagram. He is quite handsome.
 Choi Hyun-wook as Na Woo-chan: A mediator, mediates conflicts between congregations with a caring personality and excellent empathy
 Kim Kang-hoon as Lee Yong-tae: Youngest member of badminton club, a big fan of badminton player Lee Yong-dae
Lee Jae-in as Han Se-yoon: A badminton player who dreams of becoming the youngest member of national team
 Lee Ji-won as Lee Han-sol: A student and talented badminton player. She has a crush on Bang Yoon-Dam.

Supporting
 Ahn Se-bin as Yoon Hae-in (Yoon Hae-kang's little sister): Cute and feisty just like her mother. Independent and outgoing. Also, has asthma
 Jung Min-seong as Kim Tae-ho, husband of city couple, timid and caring
 Park Hyo-joo as Shin Phil-ja, wife of a city couple: A typical urban couple, married for 10 years, they came to Haenam leaving the busy city life
 Shin Jung-geun as Coach Bae: A PET at Haenam Seo Middle School and a badminton coach also known as 'white wolf'
 Kim Min-gi as Jeong In-sol: classmate of Hae-kang, Yoon-dam and Woo-chan. He is the class president. Gets excellent grades but yearns to play badminton with his new friends.
 Woo Hyun as Hong Yi-jang: The head of the village and the youth president
 Baek Ji-won as Shin Song-hee, lady who claims to be a guardian of the territorial village
 Shin Cheol-jin as grandfather
 Cha Mi-kyung as Grandma Oh-mae
 Kim Ki-cheon as principal Hae-nam, Seo-jung
 Song Seung-hwan as Lee Seung-heon: a player in National Spring Badminton League
 Ahn Sang-woo as Mr. No, badminton store owner
 Ahn Nae-sang as Fang, national team coach
 Yoon Hyun-soo as Park Chan: badminton player has crush on Se-yoon
 Hong Seo-joon as Chairman Jung: In-sol's father 
 Song Seung-hwan as Lee Seung-heon:middle school badminton player

Special appearances 
 Kim Min-seok as Hun-hoon
 Takes Grandma Oh-mae from subway station to Father's Table restaurant in spite of his busy schedule (ep.2)
 Park Ho-san as Park Sun-bae
 Yoon Hyeon-jong's friend (ep.1)
 Jonathan Thona as Jonathan
 An exchange student and GFriend's fan (ep.1)
 Jo Jae-ryong as restaurant owner (ep. 2)
 Park Ok-hool as Bang Yoon-dam's mother 
 Kim Tae-hyang as Bang Yong-shik
 Bang Yoon-dam's father, very supportive of his son and it is evident that Yoon-dam is his favorite child as he makes his children eat Yoon-Dam's favorite food every single day
 Choi Dae-hoon as reporter for badminton magazine
 Yoon Bong-gil as baseball coach
 Im Chul-hyung as Woo-chan's father
 A military man and a father with an iron fist. Initially, disapproves of his son's passion for badminton.
 Jo Ryeon as Woo-chan's mother
 Kim Sung-cheol as general secretary Park
 Ko Soo-bin as Ivana Putri
 an Indonesia's badminton player (ep. 5)
 Park Hae-soo as Lee Jae-joon
 exercising with Yoon Hyeon-jong since childhood (ep. 6)
 Lee Jun-hyeok as Banjang Yu (ep. 6)
 Kwon Dong-ho as college coach for Hyeon-jong and Jae-joon (ep. 6)
 Ki Eun-se as Lee Yu-ri
 a former badminton national and coach of Seoul Jeil Girls' Middle School badminton team, in rivalry with Haenam Jeil Girls' Middle School coach Ra Young-ja (Ep.7, 8)
 Jo Deok-hoe as disciple of director Bae
 Jo Jae-yoon comic performer as 'The End of the Earth Avengers' (Ep.7, 8, 14)
 Seo Do-jin as comic performer as 'The End of the Earth Avengers' (Ep.7, 8)
 Lee Si-eon as Busan Citizen (Ep.9)
 Heo Sung-tae as Coach Cheon (Ep.10)
 Jung Hee-tae as Hong Jeong-hyeon
 The younger brother of Hong Yi-jang 
 Lee Yong-dae as himself (Ep.15)
 Kang Seung-yoon as Kang Tae-seon
 Former badminton youth national team player. He used to be a badminton player at Haenam Middle School. (Ep.12-16) 
 Kim Jung-young as Seon-yeong
 Coach Bae's Wife
 Lee Seok-hyung as Lee Kyung-min
 Former national badminton player and a senior of Kang Tae-seon.
 Seo Dong-won as Dong-hwi (Ep.15)
 Kwon Yu-ri as Im Seo-hyun (Ep.16)
 National badminton player, the person Han Se-yoon considered as a role model
 Lee Kyu-hyung as Park Jung-hwan (Ep.16)
 Kim Seul-gi as Jang PD (Ep.16)
 Jo Jung-shik as SBC news anchor (Ep.16)
 Kim Ji-young as Ah-young (Ep.16)

Production

Casting
Tang Joon-sang was invited to play in sports drama on November 30, 2020. The cast of the series as Tang Jun-sang, Kim Kang-hoon, Oh Na-ra and Kim Sang-kyung was confirmed on January 26, 2021. Lee Jae-in joined the cast on February 25, 2021. Park Hyo-joo joined the cast in March 2021. On 25 March, production company Pan Entertainment announced that with six boys and girls; Jun-sang Tang, Sang-yeon Sang, Choi Hyun-wook, Kang-hoon Kim, Jae-in Lee, and Ji-won Lee, the lineup of players was completed. Kim Sang-kyung and Baek Ji-won appeared together in 2019 office themed drama Miss Lee.

Preparation 
Tang Joon-sang has mentioned in an interview that all the cast members who play badminton all trained extensively for months prior to filming in order to get the right forms and techniques. Kang Seung-yoon (Kang Tae-seon) has also admitted in a Behind-The-Scenes video uploaded on the SBS Catch Youtube channel that has also taken badminton lessons as he plays a top player in the drama. However, there was never a scene where he was seen playing the sport.

Filming
Principal photography began on January 30, 2021. On April 21, 2021 SBS released images of script reading. The filming locations of the series are Gangneung-si, Gangwon-do, Miryang-si and Gyeongnam.

Episodes

Original soundtrack

Part 1

Part 2

Part 3

Part 4

Part 5

Reception
Kim Hee-kyung writing for Hankyung opined that the drama is fresh in respect that it is 'bringing liveliness and tension at the same time'. Praising the directing technique, Hee-kyung wrote, "He [the director] uses his cartoon imagination to draw white wolves and bears with computer graphics." She felt that the game scenes were portrayed realistically, and to stress on the players and present a dramatic atmosphere, voices and lights were removed.

Controversy
Episode 5 drew outrage from Indonesian netizens due to its negative portrayal of the country and its people as being cheaters and lacking in sportsmanship. Some of the dialogue between the main characters about the country and the wide gap in score between Han Se-yoon from Korea and Ivana Putri from Indonesia (21-7, 21-9) were also considered insulting, leading to some accusing SBS of racism with ratings showing a slow but steady drop as a result. In response to the backlash, SBS released an apology on their official Instagram account over the way the country had been portrayed.

Viewership

Awards and nominations

References

External links
  
 Racket Boys at Daum 
 Racket Boys at Naver 
 
 
 

Seoul Broadcasting System television dramas
2021 South Korean television series debuts
2021 South Korean television series endings
South Korean teen dramas
South Korean comedy-drama television series
South Korean sports television series
Korean-language Netflix exclusive international distribution programming
Television series about teenagers
Television series by Studio S
Television series by Pan Entertainment
Badminton mass media
Middle school television series
Television shows set in South Jeolla Province